Aishwarya Arjun is an Indian actress who has acted in Tamil and Kannada movies. She made her film debut in the Tamil film Pattathu Yaanai in 2013.

Personal life
Aishwarya Arjun was born in Bengaluru , Karnataka and is the daughter of popular film actor and director Arjun Sarja and former actress Niveditha Arjun. She has a younger sister, Anjana. Her paternal and maternal grandparents are Shakti Prasad and Kalatapsvi Rajesh respectively. Her cousins are Late Chiranjeevi Sarja and Dhruva Sarja, both popular actors in Kannada.

Education
Aishwarya Arjun has completed schooling from Sacred Heart Matriculation Higher Secondary School in Church Park, Chennai and Bachelor of Commerce (B.Com.) from Stella Maris College, Chennai. Aishwarya Arjun has studied Fashion Management/Technology from Birmingham City University, Birmingham, England.

Filmography

References

External links 

 

Actresses in Tamil cinema
Living people
Actresses from Chennai
1990 births
Alumni of Birmingham City University
Stella Maris College, Chennai alumni
21st-century Indian actresses
Actresses in Kannada cinema